"Who's Zoomin' Who" is a song performed by American singer Aretha Franklin. It was written by Franklin, Preston Glass, and Narada Michael Walden for her thirtieth studio album of the same name (1985), with production overseen by Walden. The hit song was released as the album's second single on August 27, 1985, by Arista Records. It serves as the follow-up single to Franklin's chart-topping smash "Freeway of Love", reaching number 7 on the US Billboard Hot 100 chart that same year, and at the same time spending four weeks at the number-two spot on the Hot Black Singles chart (behind "Part-Time Lover" by Stevie Wonder and "Caravan of Love" by Isley-Jasper-Isley). Elsewhere, the dance pop song entered the top twenty in Ireland and the United Kingdom.

Personnel
 Aretha Franklin – lead vocals
 Walter "Baby Love" Afanasieff – keyboards
 Corrado Rustici – guitar
 Randy "The King" Jackson – synth bass, backing vocals
 Narada Michael Walden – drums, acoustic piano
 Preston "Tiger Head" Glass, Carolyn Franklin, Jim Gilstrap, Vicki Randle, Sylvester, Jeanie Tracy, Laundon Von Hendricks – backing vocals

Charts

Appearances in other media
 "Who's Zoomin' Who" is the title of the Season 1 finale episode of Grey's Anatomy without any song relation.
 "Who's Zoomin' Who" appears in the background of a bar scene in the 1986 TV pilot movie Popeye Doyle.
 "Who's Zoomin' Who" appears in a 1986 episode of Miami Vice titled "French Twist".
 "Who's Zoomin' Who" is a season 5 episode of “Beverly Hills, 90210" but had nothing to do with the song.
 "Who's Zoomin' Who" was used as the theme song to WrestleMania III.

References

1985 singles
Aretha Franklin songs
Songs written by Aretha Franklin
Songs written by Narada Michael Walden
Song recordings produced by Narada Michael Walden
Songs written by Preston Glass
Dance-pop songs
1985 songs
Arista Records singles